Ulricehamns IFK is a Swedish football club located in Ulricehamn in Ulricehamn Municipality, Västra Götaland County.

Background
Ulricehamns IFK is a football club based in  Ulricehamn that was formed in 1992 through the merger of the football section of Ulricehamns IF and IFK Ulricehamn.  Both clubs had a rich football history with UIF being over 80 years old and IFK Ulricehamn over 50 years old.  The new club title created considerable debate and the choice of Ulricehamns Idrottsförening Kamraterna (UIFK) enabled both parties to see their own club name in the new title.  The new club's colours of blue and black is a compromise from the merger.  The amalgamation of 2 historic clubs represents a concerted attempt to place Ulricehamn on the Swedish football map by laying a solid foundation to progress to Division 2.

Since their foundation Ulricehamns IFK has participated mainly in the middle and lower divisions of the Swedish football league system.  The club currently plays in Division 3 Sydvästra Götaland which is the fifth tier of Swedish football. They play their home matches at Lassalyckans IP in Ulricehamn.

Ulricehamns IFK are affiliated to the Västergötlands Fotbollförbund.

Season to season

Current squad

Attendances

In recent seasons Ulricehamns IFK have had the following average attendances:

Footnotes

External links
 Ulricehamns IFK – Official website

Football clubs in Västra Götaland County
Association football clubs established in 1992
1992 establishments in Sweden
Ulricehamn